Paul Bede Johnson  (2 November 1928 – 12 January 2023) was an English journalist, popular historian, speechwriter and author. Although associated with the political left in his early career, he became a popular conservative historian.

Johnson was educated at the Jesuit independent school Stonyhurst College, and at Magdalen College, Oxford, where he studied history. He first came to prominence in the 1950s as a journalist writing for and later editing the New Statesman magazine. A prolific writer, Johnson wrote more than 50 books and contributed to numerous magazines and newspapers. His sons include the journalist Daniel Johnson, founder of Standpoint magazine, and the businessman Luke Johnson, former chairman of Channel 4.

Early life and career 
Johnson was born in Manchester. His father, William Aloysius Johnson, was an artist and principal of the Art School in Burslem, Stoke-on-Trent, Staffordshire. At Stonyhurst College, Johnson received an education grounded in the Jesuit method, which he preferred over the more secularised curriculum of Oxford. Whilst at Oxford, Johnson was tutored by the historian A. J. P. Taylor and was a member of the exclusive Stubbs Society.

After graduating with a second-class honours degree, Johnson performed his national service in the Army, joining the King's Royal Rifle Corps and then the Royal Army Educational Corps, where he was commissioned as a captain (acting) based mainly in Gibraltar. Here he saw the "grim misery and cruelty of the Franco regime". Johnson's military record helped the Paris periodical Réalités hire him, where he was assistant editor from 1952 to 1955.

Johnson adopted a left-wing political outlook during this period as he witnessed in May 1952 the police response to a riot in Paris (Communists were rioting over the visit of American general, Matthew Ridgway, who commanded the US Eighth Army during the Korean War; he had just been appointed NATO's Supreme Commander in Europe), the "ferocity [of which] I would not have believed had I not seen it with my own eyes." Then he served as the New Statesmans Paris correspondent. For a time, he was a convinced Bevanite and an associate of Aneurin Bevan himself. Moving back to London in 1955, Johnson joined the Statesmans staff.

Some of Johnson's writing already showed signs of iconoclasm. His first book, about the Suez War, appeared in 1957. An anonymous commentator in The Spectator wrote that "one of his [Johnson's] remarks about Mr Gaitskell is quite as damaging as anything he has to say about Sir Anthony Eden", but the Labour Party's opposition to the Suez intervention led Johnson to assert "the old militant spirit of the party was back". The following year he attacked Ian Fleming's James Bond novel Dr No, and in 1964 he warned of "The Menace of Beatlism" in an article contemporarily described as being "rather exaggerated" by Henry Fairlie in The Spectator.

Johnson was successively lead writer, deputy editor and editor of the New Statesman from 1965 to 1970. He was found suspect for his attendances at the soirées of Lady Antonia Fraser, then married a Conservative MP. There was some resistance to his appointment as New Statesman editor, not least from the writer Leonard Woolf, who objected to a Catholic filling the position, and Johnson was placed on six months' probation.

Statesmen and Nations (1971), the anthology of his Statesman articles, contains numerous reviews of biographies of Conservative politicians and an openness to continental Europe; in one article Johnson took a positive view of events of May 1968 in Paris, an article that at the time of first publication led Colin Welch in The Spectator to accuse Johnson of possessing "a taste for violence". According to this book, Johnson filed 54 overseas reports during his Statesman years.

Shift rightward 
During the late 1970s, Johnson began writing articles in the New Statesman attacking trade unions in particular, and leftism in general.  Slightly later, the New Statesman may have repudiated this, when it published an article criticising him, in a series of articles "Windbags of the West" about various right-wing journalists.

From 1981 to 2009, Johnson wrote a column for The Spectator; initially focusing on media developments; it subsequently acquired the title "And Another Thing". In his journalism, Johnson generally dealt with issues and events which he saw as indicative of a general social decline, whether in art, education, religious observance or personal conduct. He continued to contribute to the magazine, although less frequently than before. During the same period he contributed a column to the Daily Mail until 2001. In a Daily Telegraph interview in November 2003, he criticised the Mail for having a pernicious impact: "I came to the conclusion that that kind of journalism is bad for the country, bad for society, bad for the newspaper."

Johnson was a regular contributor to The Daily Telegraph, mainly as a book reviewer, and in the U.S. wrote for The New York Times, The Wall Street Journal, Commentary, and the National Review. He also contributed to Forbes magazine. For a time in the early 1980s he wrote for The Sun after Rupert Murdoch urged him to "raise its tone a bit".

Johnson was a critic of modernity because of what he saw as its moral relativism, and he objected to those who use Charles Darwin's theory of evolution to justify their atheism, such as Richard Dawkins and Steven Pinker, or use it to promote biotechnological experimentation. As a conservative Catholic, Johnson regarded liberation theology as a heresy and defended clerical celibacy, but departed from others in seeing many good reasons for ordination of women as priests.

Admired by conservatives in the United States and elsewhere, he was strongly anticommunist. Johnson defended Richard Nixon in the Watergate scandal, finding his cover-up considerably less heinous than Bill Clinton's perjury and Oliver North's involvement in the Iran–Contra affair. In his Spectator column, Johnson defended his friend Jonathan Aitken and expressed admiration for Chilean dictator Augusto Pinochet and limited admiration for Spanish fascist dictator Francisco Franco.

Johnson was active in the campaign, led by Norman Lamont, to prevent Pinochet's extradition to Spain after his 1998 arrest in London. "There have been countless attempts to link him to human rights atrocities, but nobody has provided a single scrap of evidence", Johnson was reported as saying in 1999. In Heroes (2008), Johnson returned to his longstanding claim that criticism of Pinochet's dictatorship on human rights grounds came from "the Soviet Union, whose propaganda machine successfully demonised [Pinochet] among the chattering classes all over the world. It was the last triumph of the KGB before it vanished into history's dustbin."

Johnson described France as "a republic run by bureaucratic and party elites, whose errors are dealt with by strikes, street riots and blockades" rather than a democracy.

Johnson was a Eurosceptic who played a prominent role in the "No" campaign during the 1975 referendum on whether Britain should stay in the EC. In 2010 Johnson noted that "you can't have a common currency without a common financial policy, and you can't have that without a common government. The three things are interconnected. So this [European integration] was entirely foreseeable. Not much careful thought and judgment goes into the EU. It's entirely run by bureaucrats."

Johnson served on the Royal Commission on the Press (1974–77) and was a member of the Cable Authority (regulator) from 1984 to 1990.

Personal life 
Paul Johnson was married from 1958 to the psychotherapist and former Labour Party parliamentary candidate Marigold Hunt, daughter of Dr. Thomas Hunt, physician to Winston Churchill, Clement Attlee, and Anthony Eden. They had three sons and a daughter: the journalist Daniel Johnson, a freelance writer, editor of Standpoint magazine, and previously associate editor of The Daily Telegraph; Luke Johnson, businessman and former chairman of Channel 4 Television; Sophie Johnson-Clark, an independent television executive; and Cosmo Johnson, playwright. Paul and Marigold Johnson have ten grandchildren. Marigold Johnson's sister, Sarah, an art historian, married the journalist, former diplomat and politician George Walden; their daughter, Celia Walden, is the wife of television presenter and former newspaper editor Piers Morgan.

In 1998, it was revealed Johnson had an affair lasting eleven years with Gloria Stewart, a freelance journalist, who recorded them together in his study "at the behest of a British tabloid"; she claimed to have made the affair public via the newspapers after what she saw as Johnson's hypocrisy over his views on morality, religion and family values, but acknowledged that their affair had ended when Johnson "found another girlfriend".

Johnson was an avid watercolourist. He was also a friend of playwright Tom Stoppard, who dedicated his 1978 play Night and Day to him.

Johnson died at his home in London on 12 January 2023, at the age of 94.

Honours
In 2006, Johnson was honoured with the Presidential Medal of Freedom by U.S. President George W. Bush.

Johnson was appointed Commander of the Order of the British Empire (CBE) in the 2016 Birthday Honours for services to literature.

Partial bibliography 

Johnson's books are listed by subject or type. The country of publication is the UK, unless stated otherwise.

Anthologies, polemics and contemporary history 
 .
 .
 .
 .  An anthology of New Statesman articles from the 1950s and 1960s.
 .
 .
  – contributor.
 .
 .
 .
 1994 The Quotable Paul Johnson A Topical Compilation of His Wit, Wisdom and Satire (George J. Marlin, Richard P. Rabatin, Heather Higgins (Editors)) 1994 Noonday Press/1996 Atlantic Books (US)
 1994 Wake Up Britain – a Latter-day Pamphlet Weidenfeld & Nicolson
 1996 To Hell with Picasso & Other Essays: Selected Pieces from "The Spectator" Weidenfeld & Nicolson
 2009 Churchill (biography), 192 pp.
 2012 Darwin: Portrait of a genius (Viking, 176 pages)

Art and architecture 
 1980 British Cathedrals Weidenfeld & Nicolson 
 1993 Gerald Laing : Portraits Thomas Gibson Fine Art Ltd (with Gerald Laing & David Mellor MP)
 1999 Julian Barrow's London Fine Art Society
 2003 Art: A New History Weidenfeld & Nicolson

History 
 1972 The Offshore Islanders: England's People from Roman Occupation to the Present/to European Entry [1985 ed as History of the English People; 1998 ed as Offshore Islanders: A History of the English People] Weidenfeld & Nicolson
 1974 Elizabeth I: a Study in Power and Intellect Weidenfeld & Nicolson
 1974 The Life and Times of Edward III Weidenfeld & Nicolson
 1976 Civilizations of the Holy Land Weidenfeld & Nicolson

 1977 Education of an Establishment in The World of the Public School (pp. 13–28), edited by George MacDonald Fraser, Weidenfeld & Nicolson /St Martins Press (US edition)
 1978 The Civilization of Ancient Egypt Weidenfeld & Nicolson
 1981 Ireland: A Concise History from the Twelfth Century to the Present Day [as ...Land of Troubles 1980 Eyre Methuen] Granada
 1983 A History of the Modern World from 1917 to the 1980s Weidenfeld & Nicolson – Paperback
 1983 Modern Times: A History of the World from the 1920s to the 1980s Weidenfeld & Nicolson [later, ...Present Time and ...Year 2000 2005 ed] Weidenfeld & Nicolson – Hardcover
 1986 The Oxford Book of Political Anecdotes Oxford University Press (editor)
 1987 Gold Fields A Centenary Portrait Weidenfeld & Nicolson
 1987 The History of the Jews [2001ed] Weidenfeld & Nicolson (later editions titled A History of the Jews)
 1991 The Birth of the Modern: World Society 1815–1830 Weidenfeld & Nicolson (UK) 
 1997 A History of the American People Weidenfeld & Nicolson  
 2000 The Renaissance [: A Short History *] Weidenfeld & Nicolson/*Random House (USA)
 2002 Napoleon (Lives S.) Weidenfeld & Nicolson [2003 Phoenix pbk]
 2005 George Washington: The Founding Father (Eminent Lives Series) Atlas Books
 2006 Creators: From Chaucer and Durer to Picasso and Disney HarperCollins Publishers (US) 
 2007 Heroes: From Alexander the Great and Julius Caesar to Churchill and De Gaulle HarperCollins Publishers (US)  ; HarperCollins Publishing link to book 
 2010 Humorists: From Hogarth to Noel Coward HarperCollins Publishers (US) 
 2011 Socrates: A Man For Our Times Viking (US)

Memoirs 
 2004 The Vanished Landscape: A 1930s Childhood in the Potteries  Weidenfeld & Nicolson: 
 2010 Brief Lives Hutchinson

Novels 
 1959 Left of Centre MacGibbon & Kee ["Left of Centre describes the meeting of a Complacent Young Man with an Angry Old City"]
 1964 Merrie England MacGibbon & Kee

Religion 
 1975 Pope John XXIII Hutchinson
 1977 A History of Christianity Weidenfeld & Nicolson /1976 Simon & Schuster /Atheneum (US)   (S&S Touchstone division paperback edition published in 1995)
 1982 Pope John Paul II and the Catholic Restoration St Martins Press
 1996 The Quest for God: A Personal Pilgrimage Weidenfeld & Nicolson/HarperCollins (US)
 1997 The Papacy Weidenfeld & Nicolson
 2010 Jesus: A Biography From a Believer Penguin Books

Travel 
 1973 The Highland Jaunt Collins (with George Gale)
 1974 A Place in History: Places & Buildings of British History Omega [Thames TV (UK) tie-in]
 1978 National Trust Book of British Castles  Granada Paperback [1992 Weidenfeld ed as Castles of England, Scotland And Wales]
 1984 The Aerofilms Book of London from the Air Weidenfeld & Nicolson

References

Footnotes

Sources 
 Robin Blackburn "A Fabian at the End of His Tether" (New Statesman 14 December 1979, reprinted in Stephen Howe (ed) Lines of Dissent: Writings from the New Statesman 1913–88 London: Verso, 1988, pp284–96
 Christopher Booker The Seventies: Portrait of a Decade Allen Lane, 1980 (chapters: "Paul Johnson: The Convert Who Went over the Top" pp238–44 and "Facing the Catastrophe" pp304–7

External links 
 Official Website: The Paul Johnson Archives
 Paul Johnson's articles in The Spectator
 Feud – and it's a scorcher! – article by John Walsh on Johnson's differences with The Guardian, in The Independent 28 July 1997
 New York Times Featured Author 9 September 2000: Paul Johnson
 White House press release regarding Presidential Medal of Freedom awarded to Johnson
 Paul Johnson's articles and interviews (English and Spanish)

 Booknotes interview with Johnson on A History of the American People, 5 April 1998.
 .
 The Weekend Interview with Paul Johnson: Why America Will Stay on Top by Brian Carney (Wall Street Journal, 5 March 2011)
 Paul Johnson on BBC Radio 4's Desert Island Discs, 15 January 2012

1928 births
2023 deaths
20th-century British Army personnel
20th-century British historians
20th-century English male writers
21st-century British historians
21st-century English male writers
Alumni of Magdalen College, Oxford
British Roman Catholics
British historians of religion
British magazine editors
British male journalists
English watercolourists
Charles Darwin biographers
Commanders of the Order of the British Empire
Historians of Christianity
King's Royal Rifle Corps soldiers
Military personnel from Manchester
New Statesman people
People educated at Stonyhurst College
Presidential Medal of Freedom recipients
Roman Catholic writers
Royal Army Educational Corps officers
The American Spectator people
Writers from Manchester
British anti-communists